The Fisher Homestead, located on U.S. Route 60 in Cloverport, Kentucky, was listed on the National Register of Historic Places in 1983.  The listing included three contributing buildings.

The homestead house is Federal in style and was built in c.1801.  It is one-and-a-half-stories tall and has a one-story brick ell.  The brick is laid in common bond.

References

Farms on the National Register of Historic Places in Kentucky
Federal architecture in Kentucky
Buildings and structures completed in 1801
National Register of Historic Places in Breckinridge County, Kentucky
1801 establishments in Kentucky